Anthony “Tony” Christopher Woods (born July 20, 1980) an American military veteran of Operation Iraqi Freedom, who was discharged from the United States Army in 2008 for violating the military's "Don't ask, don't tell" policy. A member of the Democratic Party, he has served as the Maryland Secretary of Veterans Affairs under Governor Wes Moore since 2023.

In 2009, Woods ran for U.S. Congress in California's 10th congressional district to fill a vacant seat, in a bid to become the first openly gay African American in Congress. He placed 4th, receiving 8% of a special election vote on September 1, 2009, behind John Garamendi, Mark DeSaulnier, and Joan Buchanan. He was part of the 2011-2012 Class of White House Fellows.

Early life and education
Born on July 20, 1980, at Travis Air Force Base in Fairfield, California, Woods was raised by a single mother who supported her family as a small business owner and housekeeper. As a child, Woods lived in both Fairfield and Vacaville in the North Bay region of the San Francisco Bay Area. He graduated with honors from Vanden High School in 1999. Woods attended the United States Military Academy after graduation, having received a nomination from Congressman Vic Fazio (D CA-3).

At West Point, he majored in economics and political science, and graduated in 2003 with a B.S. in Economics and American Politics. In addition to his double major, he completed an engineering concentration (minor) in computer science.

Career

Military service 
Woods was commissioned in the United States Army as a second lieutenant in the Armor branch and began the Armor Officer Basic Course at Fort Knox, Kentucky, in July 2003. While there, he volunteered for his first deployment to Iraq to lead a platoon of National Guard soldiers. Woods deployed to the Diyala province of Iraq, where he served for eleven months.

Woods returned from this deployment to the U.S. in January, 2005 and was transferred from Fort Bragg to Fort Carson, Colorado. Later that year, in June, 2005, he made his second deployment to Iraq with the 3rd Armored Cavalry Regiment.

Upon return from his second deployment, the Army selected Woods to teach at West Point, an unusual appointment for so junior an officer and one which would require him to earn a graduate degree first. That year, he matriculated to the John F. Kennedy School of Government at Harvard University where he studied for a master's degree in public policy.

While at Harvard, Woods volunteered to mentor low-income minorities applying to college and numerous other community leadership activities, including co-founding the first student chapter of the Fuller Center for Housing, and making three trips to New Orleans to assist families struggling to rebuild following Hurricane Katrina. For this work, he was among a group of students awarded the Robert F. Kennedy Public Service Award.During the summer of 2007, Woods co-led a group of thirty cyclists across the U.S. to raise money for Habitat for Humanity through a non-profit group known as Bike & Build. The trip took them from the Outer Banks of North Carolina to San Diego, California. The group raised over $130,000 and built homes in five different states during the course of the trip across the United States.

Prior to graduation in 2008, Woods competed to speak at Harvard's annual commencement and was one of three students chosen to give a commencement speech.

Shortly after graduation, Woods reported to Fort Knox, Kentucky, for the Armor Captain's Career Course. Shortly thereafter, Woods outed himself as gay, and was subsequently discharged under the government's now repealed “Don't ask, don't tell” policy. For this decision, Woods was ordered to reimburse the Army for the $35,000 tuition paid on his behalf to attend Harvard. In December 2008, the U.S. Army completed the discharge process for Woods.

Later career 
After his honorable discharge from the Army, Woods worked as an aide for Governor David Paterson of New York.

2010 congressional campaign
On March 18, 2009, Woods declared his intention run for Congress in a special election to replace Rep. Ellen Tauscher (D-CA), who was nominated by President Barack Obama to serve as Undersecretary of State for Arms Control and International Security. His campaign made it a high-profile affair receiving national attention. However, his bid to become the first openly gay African-American elected to Congress ended when he lost a special election held on September 1, 2009, receiving under 9 percent of the vote.

ServiceNation
Following the campaign in California, Woods returned to Washington, D.C., where he worked for the nonprofit, Be the Change, Inc. Woods helped run the organization's ServiceNation campaign devoted to increasing support for expanding national service programs like the Peace Corps and Americorps. Woods functioned as the Director of the "Service as a Strategy" initiative helping develop volunteer-driven solutions for American cities.

White House Fellowship
In 2011, Woods became a member of the 2011–2012 Class of White House Fellows. As a fellow, Woods was assigned to the United States Office of Personnel Management under John Berry.

Maryland Secretary of Veterans Affairs
On January 12, 2023, Maryland governor-elect Wes Moore nominated Woods as the Secretary of the Maryland Department of Veterans Affairs. His nomination was unanimously approved by the Maryland Senate on February 17.

See also

Sexual orientation and the United States military

References

External links
Anthony Woods for Congress, Official Campaign Website
2011-2012 White House Fellow website

1980 births
African-American United States Army personnel
American LGBT military personnel
American military personnel discharged for homosexuality
United States Army personnel of the Iraq War
United States Army officers
California Democrats
Gay politicians
Harvard Kennedy School alumni
LGBT African Americans
Living people
People from Fairfield, California
United States Military Academy alumni
Military personnel from California
State cabinet secretaries of Maryland